Fred Göran Karlsson (born February 17, 1946 in Turku) is a professor emeritus of general linguistics at the University of Helsinki.

Education and background 
Karlsson's father Göran Karlsson was a prominent linguist and worked as a professor of Finnish Language and Literature at Åbo Akademi.

Fred Karlsson studied Finnish language at Åbo Akademi and phonetics at the University of Turku, and graduated in 1969. In 1972 he graduated in linguistics at the University of Chicago.

Karlsson earned his Ph.D. in phonetics at the University of Turku in 1974.

Academic career 
In computational linguistics Karlsson has designed a language-independent formalism called Constraint Grammar. It makes possible the automatic morphological disambiguation and syntactic analysis of ordinary running text that has been supplied with all theoretically possible morphological and syntactic interpretations. The basic original reference is Karlsson (1990) which defines Constraint Grammar.

Karlsson has also worked on the history of linguistics, where his main contribution is participation in a book by Even Hovdhaugen, Fred Karlsson, Carol Henriksen, and Bengt Sigurd, The History of Linguistics in the Nordic Countries, Societas Scientiarum Fennica, Jyväskylä 2000.

Although Karlsson is a Swedish-speaking Finn, his knowledge of his second native language Finnish is exceptionally good, and he is widely considered a de facto authority on the language's rules. His work on the language (e.g. Finnish: An Essential Grammar, Karlsson (2004), originally published in 1983 and republished in 1999) has been used in various Finnish translations of open source projects.

Sources

External links 
Official home page
Karlsson (1990)
Hovdhaugen, Karlsson, Henriksen & Sigurd 2000

1946 births
Living people
Finnish scientists
Swedish-speaking Finns
Linguists from Finland
Academic staff of the University of Helsinki